I Write Like is a website created by Russian software programmer Dmitry Chestnykh, founder of software company Coding Robots. The site analyzes users' writing samples and, by looking for certain keywords, vocabulary, and style via a naive Bayes classifier returns the name of a popular writer the sample most closely resembles. It was launched on July 9, 2010, and, according to reports, has gone viral, getting over 100,000 visitors on July 13, 2010, and spreading quickly across other blogs and popular social-networking websites such as Facebook and Twitter.

According to the Toronto Star, the website's popularity soared as a result of a series of rants made by actor Mel Gibson; New York City-based blog Gawker submitted transcripts of Gibson's rants to find that the site website compared them to writings by Canadian writer and feminist Margaret Atwood. Film critic Roger Ebert tried the site and said on a tweet that "I Write Like thinks I write like Margaret Atwood, she writes like H. P. Lovecraft, and he writes like James Joyce". The Star also reported the result that Ontario premier Dalton McGuinty's Children’s hospital in Ottawa celebrates big expansion closely resembles Joyce's A Portrait of the Artist as a Young Man. The Guardian reported that Atwood herself tried out the website, and it said that her writing resembles that of novelist Stephen King in one attempt and like Joyce on another try. William Gibson also tried the site, which said his writing resembles that of Vladimir Nabokov. A transcript of a speech made by U.S. President Barack Obama in June 2010 has been compared to author David Foster Wallace, while the lyrics to Lady Gaga's song "Alejandro" have been compared to William Shakespeare. Other bloggers, including author Teresa Nielsen Hayden, have expressed anger and frustration to find that the website has compared their writings to that by The Da Vinci Code author Dan Brown. Despite the website's early success, Chestnykh was cautious to say that its accuracy still needs improvement, as he has only been able to upload "a few books by some 50 different authors" into its database. He says that he intends to include advanced features such as "probability percentages" that a user-submitted passage resembles a certain author.

References

Literature websites
Internet properties established in 2010